Mariyam Afeefa (born 29 July 1983) is a Maldivian actress. She has established a career in Maldivian films and is the recipient of several awards, including two Gaumee Film Awards. She was featured in listings of the nation's most popular personalities.

Afeefa made her film debut in Ahmed Nimal's critically and commercially successful romantic film Vaaloabi Engeynama (2006), which fetched her first Gaumee Film Award for Best Actress. She then worked in several short films and television series before making her second collaborating with Nimal for his erotic horror thriller Khalaas (2008), followed by Abdul Fahtah's horror film Jinni (2010) where she received a Maldives Film Awards nomination as Best Actress for the latter. She was voted as the "Most Entertaining Actress" in the SunFM Awards for two consecutive years. In 2011, she was bestowed with her second Gaumee Film Award for Best Actress for her performance as the gluttonous wife, in the Moomin Fuad-directed crime tragedy drama Loodhifa (2011).

Career
Afeefa made her film debut in Ahmed Nimal's romantic film Vaaloabi Engeynama (2006), starred alongside Yoosuf Shafeeu, Fathimath Fareela and Fauziyya Hassan which was a critical and commercial success, considered to be the most successful Maldivian release of the year. The film follows a conflicted husband struggling to convey equal affection towards his two spouses. Her performance as the superlative wife received critical appreciation, winning her a Gaumee Film Award as the Best Actress and a Miadhu Crystal Award as the Best Female Debut.

Ahmed Nimal-directed erotic horror thriller Khalaas was released in 2008 which follows a newly married couple who relocate themselves to Sri Lanka. Starring opposite Ali Seezan and Nadhiya Hassan, Afeefa played the role of Sara, a bewildered wife who encounters several supernatural activities. The film received mixed reviews from critics specific appraisal being subjected to its bold and erotic theme.

In 2010, Afeefa was featured in Abdul Fahtah's horror film Jinni alongside Ali Seezan. Based on true incidents that occurred in an island of Maldives, she played the role of Thahumeena, a simple-going girl who romantically link ups with a visitor and a ghost who seduce the same person in the shape of Thahumeena. Prior to release the film was marketed to be "full of suspense" and "unique" compared to other mediocre Maldivian horror films. Upon release, the film received mixed reviews from critics; majority of them complaining for having the "same old feeling" of prior horror flicks though the performance were noted to be satisfactory. Despite the mixed reviews, the film witnessed a positive response at the box office, screening a total of twenty two housefull shows in Male', declaring it as a Mega-Hit. At the 2nd Maldives Film Awards, Afeefa received a nomination for the Best Actress category.

Her first release of 2011, was Mohamed Aboobakuru's critical and commercial failure Hiyy Vindhaa Nulaa, where her role in the film was regarded and "unnecessary" and "meaningless". It was followed by her playing the role of Sherin, the gluttonous wife who is after her husband's wealth, in the Moomin Fuad-directed crime tragedy drama Loodhifa. Featuring an ensemble cast, the film deals with current social issues in the society told from different perspectives of the characters. Made on a budget of MVR 600,000, the film was declared a commercial failure though it received wide critical acclaim, praising the performance of cast and the film's "realism" in its language, characters and their attitude. At the 7th Gaumee Film Awards she was bestowed with her second Gaumee Film Award for Best Actress. She also received a nomination in the same category at the 2nd Maldives Film Awards ceremony.

Media image
In 2010, Afeefa was voted as the "Most Entertaining Actress" in the SunFM Awards 2009, an award night ceremony initiated by Sun Media Group to honour the most recognized personalities in different fields, during the previous year, while defending the award in the next year. In 2012, she was ranked at the ninth position in the list of "Best Actresses in Maldives" compiled by Haveeru.

Filmography

Feature film

Television

Short film

Accolades

References 

Living people
People from Malé
21st-century Maldivian actresses
Maldivian film actresses
1983 births